Guruwari or "totem design" or "seed power" is an idea that appears in the Warlpiri language of the culture of indigenous Australian peoples.  Guruwari is intimately associated with The Dreaming.

Guruwari also refers to the energetic "pattern" in the Aboriginal concept that states that every activity or process leaves an "energetic residue" in the ground, similar to plants leaving an image of themselves in the shape of the seeds. It is, consequently, an important part of the fields and it imprints its metaphysical, deep meaning.

References
 Munn, Nancy D. (1984). The Transformation Of Subjects Into Objects in Walbiri and Pitjantjartjara Myths. In: M. Charlesworth, H. Morphy, D. Bell and K. Maddock, Eds. Religion in Aboriginal Australia:  An Anthology. St. Lucia, Queensland: University of Queensland Press.
 Stanislav Grof (2006) . When the Impossible Happens: Adventures in Non-Ordinary Realities.

Australian Aboriginal mythology